Jacques Lavoie (4 November 1936 – 20 January 2000) was a Progressive Conservative then Liberal member of the House of Commons of Canada. Born in Montreal, Quebec, he was a public servant and radiology technician before entering politics.

He was first elected at the Hochelaga riding in a 14 October 1975 by-election following the resignation of incumbent Gérard Pelletier. He switched to the Liberal party in June 1977, but ran as an independent candidate in the 1979 election as he was unsuccessful in becoming the party's nominee.

Timeline

Election campaigns
 1963 federal election: Defeated at Quebec West
 1965 federal election: Defeated at Quebec West
 1972 federal election: Defeated at Hochelaga
 1974 federal election: Defeated at Hochelaga
 14 October 1975 by-election: Elected at Hochelaga
 1979 federal election: Defeated at Hochelaga—Maisonneuve

Caucus service
 14 October 1975 – 13 June 1977: Progressive Conservative Party, before end of 30th Parliament
 14 June 1977 – 26 March 1979: Liberal Party of Canada, to end of 30th Parliament

Electoral record

References

External links

Jacques Lavoie's obituary 

1936 births
2000 deaths
Liberal Party of Canada MPs
Members of the House of Commons of Canada from Quebec
Politicians from Montreal
Progressive Conservative Party of Canada MPs